Dayton Township is one of fourteen townships in Bremer County, Iowa, United States.  At the 2010 census, its population was 380.

Geography
According to the USGS, it contains two cemeteries: Saint Johns Evangelical Lutheran and Saint Pauls United Church of Christ.

References

External links
 City-Data.com

Townships in Bremer County, Iowa
Waterloo – Cedar Falls metropolitan area
Townships in Iowa